Tibor Czinkán (10 August 1929 – 20 December 2013) was a Hungarian basketball player who competed in the 1952 Summer Olympics.

He was part of the Hungarian basketball team, which was eliminated after the group stage of the 1952 tournament. He played five matches.

References

1929 births
2013 deaths
Hungarian men's basketball players
Olympic basketball players of Hungary
Basketball players at the 1952 Summer Olympics
FIBA EuroBasket-winning players